On June 29, 1995, the Sampoong Department Store in Seoul, South Korea, collapsed due to a structural failure. The collapse killed 502 people and injured 937, making it the largest peacetime disaster in South Korean history. It was the deadliest non-deliberate modern building collapse until the 2013 Rana Plaza factory collapse in Bangladesh.

Construction on the store began in 1987 and was completed in 1990. The company initially contracted to build the structure withdrew after the chairman of Sampoong Group's construction division, Lee Joon, demanded changes to the concrete support columns that introduced structural concerns. Lee Joon ultimately used his own company to complete construction. Investigators blamed the collapse primarily on the column specifications which were incorrect for a flat-slab building design. 

On December 27, 1995, Lee Joon was convicted of criminal negligence and sentenced to 10 years and 6 months imprisonment and his son Lee Han-sang was convicted of corruption and accidental homicide and sentenced to 7 years imprisonment. On appeal Lee Joon's sentence was reduced to 7 years and 6 months imprisonment. As well, two city planners from the Socho District of Seoul were convicted of taking bribes.

Background
In the events leading up to the 1988 Summer Olympics, there was a large development boom in the Seoul Capital Area. Because of bans against international construction contractors signing contracts for projects in Seoul at the time, almost all buildings were being erected by South Korean companies, which typically built the structures quickly because of the large number of projects assigned to them.

The Sampoong Group began construction of the Sampoong Department Store in 1987 over a tract of land in the Seocho District previously used as a landfill. The building's plans originally called for a residential apartment building with four floors to be built by Woosung Construction. However, during construction, the blueprints were changed by the future chairman of Sampoong Group's construction division, Lee Joon, to instead create a large department store. This involved cutting away a number of support columns to install escalators and the addition of a fifth floor (originally meant as a roller skating rink but later changed to a food court). 

Woosung refused to carry out these changes due to serious structural concerns. In response, Lee Joon fired them and used his own company to complete the store's construction instead. The building was completed in late 1989, and the department store opened to the public on July 7, 1990, attracting an estimated 40,000 people per day during the building's five years of existence. The store consisted of north and south wings connected by an atrium.

The completed building was a flat-slab structure without crossbeams or a steel skeleton, which effectively meant that there was no way to transfer the load across the floors. The fifth-story restaurant floor had a heated concrete base referred to as ondol, which has hot water pipes going through it; the presence of the  ondol greatly increased the weight and thickness of the slab. Further to this, the store's three 15-tonne air conditioning units were installed on the roof leading to a greater structural strain. The air conditioning was also exceedingly loud and led to noise complaints by customers. 

In 1993, the air conditioning units were dragged across the overloaded roof, resulting in cracking. The units were moved over column 5E, where the most visible cracks in the fifth floor were seen before the collapse. The cracks in the columns worsened because the columns supporting the fifth floor were not aligned with the ones supporting lower floors, thus causing the load of the fifth floor to be transferred through the slab.

Timeline of events

Collapse
In April 1995, cracks began to appear in the ceiling of the fifth floor in the south wing, with the only response by Lee Joon and his management staff to move merchandise and stores from the top floor to the basement. 

On the morning of June 29, the number of cracks in the area increased dramatically, prompting managers to close parts of the top floor; the store management failed to shut the building down or issue formal evacuation orders, as the number of customers in the building at the time was unusually high, and management did not want to lose the day's revenue. When civil engineering experts were invited to inspect the structure, a cursory check revealed that the building was at risk of collapse. The facility's manager examined the slab in one of the fifth-floor restaurants only hours before the collapse. Five hours before the collapse, the first of several loud bangs was heard emanating from the top floors, as the vibration of the air conditioning caused the cracks in the slabs to widen further.

Around then, it was realized that collapse of the building was inevitable, and an emergency board meeting was held. While the directors suggested to him that all staff and customers be evacuated, Lee Joon angrily refused to do so for fear of revenue losses. However, Lee Joon and the executives left the building safely before the collapse occurred. He did not even inform his own daughter-in-law, Chu Kyung Young, who was one of the employees in the building, of the imminent danger: she became trapped in the rubble and was rescued only days later.

At about 5:00 p.m., KST (UTC+9:00), as the fifth floor ceiling began to sink, store workers finally closed off all customer access to the fifth floor. The store was packed with hundreds of shoppers 57 minutes before the collapse, but Lee Joon did not close the store or carry out repairs during that time. When the store started to produce cracking sounds at about 5:52 p.m., workers began to sound alarms and evacuate the building, but it was too late: the roof gave way, and the air conditioning units crashed through into the overloaded fifth floor, which in turn gave way and caused the unit to crash through the lower floors. The main columns, which had weakened to allow the insertion of the escalators, also collapsed, and the building's south wing began pancaking into the basement. In less than twenty seconds, all the columns in the store's south wing had given way, killing 502 people and trapping more than 1,500 inside. The disaster resulted in property damage totaling about ₩270 billion (approximately US$216 million at the time and approximately US$420 million in 2022).

Rescue efforts
Rescue crews were on the scene within minutes of the disaster, with cranes and other heavy equipment being brought in the next day. However, Seoul's mayor, Choi Pyong-yol, announced the rescue would be called off due to concerns that the unstable remains of the store would collapse. After massive protests, especially from friends and relatives of those still missing, Choi and officials decided to continue looking for survivors, with the remains of the store being steadied by guy cables. At one point, Korea Telecom was transmitting a signal every half hour, designed to trigger cellphones or pagers that trapped survivors might be carrying.

After nearly a week, the focus was on removing the debris, but construction crews were careful to check for victims. Two weeks after the collapse, city officials concluded that anybody who was still in the building must have already died; therefore, further efforts would be made only towards "recovery", not "rescue", despite the possibility of victims being able to survive for much longer. Despite the sweltering heat, some who were not rescued in the first few days avoided dehydration by drinking rainwater. The last to be rescued, 19-year-old store clerk Park Seung-hyun (Korean: 박승현, Hanja: 朴勝賢), was pulled from the wreckage 17 days after the collapse with a few scratches; 18-year-old Yoo Ji-hwan was pulled out after nearly twelve days; and a man rescued after nine days reported that other trapped survivors had drowned from the rain and from the water used for fire suppression.

Investigation 

The investigation to the collapse was headed by Professor Chung Lan (Korean: 정란, Hanja: 鄭鑾) of Dankook University's engineering school. Shortly after the collapse, leaking gas was suspected as the probable cause because two gas explosions had occurred elsewhere in Seoul that year. However, the fires in the rubble were from burning automotive gasoline coming from crushed cars parked in the underground garage, and a gas explosion would have been significantly larger. It was also widely feared that there had been a terrorist attack, with North Korea as the prime suspect. However, the fact the building collapsed downward, with little debris thrown outward, ruled out a significant explosion, according to South Korean and American experts.

Once the investigation focused on structural failure, it was initially believed the building's poorly-laid foundation and the unstable ground that it was built on, both led to the failure. Investigation of the rubble revealed that a substandard concrete mix of cement and sea water and poorly-reinforced concrete was used for the ceilings and walls.

Further investigation revealed that the building was built with incorrect application of a technique called "flat slab construction". Reinforced concrete buildings are often built by using columns and beams, with the floor slab supported over the full length of the beams. "Flat slab construction" does not use beams but supports the floor slab directly on the columns. The area of floor around the columns must be reinforced in order to carry the load; if the columns are too narrow, they can punch through the slab.

Examination of the building showed the concrete columns installed were only 60 cm in diameter, below the required 80 cm shown in the plans. Worse still, the number of steel reinforcement bars embedded into the concrete was 8, not the required 16, which gave the building only half its needed strength. Steel reinforcements intended to strengthen the concrete floor were placed 10 cm from the top instead of 5 cm, decreasing the structure's strength by about another 20%.

Fire shields were installed around all escalators to prevent the spread of fire from floor to floor, but to install them, the support columns were cut, further reducing their diameter. The reduced diameter concentrated the load on a smaller area of the slab, leading to an eventual puncturing of it. Those factors, along with the addition of a fifth floor including restaurants and heavy restaurant equipment, all contributed to the building's eventual failure. The original building design would have been more than twice as strong as needed to remain erect. As it is, the flawed structure managed to stand for almost five years.

Investigators finally pinpointed the direct cause of the collapse, known as the "trigger" or tipping point, in the building's history. It was revealed that two years before the collapse, the building's three rooftop air-conditioning units had been moved because of noise complaints from neighbors on the east side of the building. The building's managers admitted noticing cracks in the roof during the move, but instead of lifting them with a crane, the units were put on rollers and dragged across the roof, further destabilizing the surface by each unit's immense weight. 

Cracks formed in the roof slabs and the main support columns were forced downward; column 5E took a direct hit, forming cracks at the position connected to the fifth-floor restaurants. According to survivor accounts, each time the air conditioners were switched on, the vibrations radiated through the cracks, reaching the supporting columns and widening the cracks, over the course of two years. On the day of the tragedy, although the units were shut off, it was too late; the structure had suffered irreversible damage, and the fifth floor slab around column 5E finally gave way.

Legal

Trial and prison sentence
During his interrogation with Professor Chung, Lee Joon sparked further controversy by saying that his main concern was that the collapse of the store not only harmed the customers, but also inflicted great financial damage to his company. On December 27, 1995, Lee Joon was found guilty of criminal negligence and received a prison sentence of ten and a half years. Prosecutors originally asked for Lee Joon's sentence of twenty years, but was reduced to seven and a half years on appeal. Lee Joon died on October 4, 2003, months after his release from prison, of complications from diabetes, high blood pressure and kidney disease.

Lee Joon's son and the store's CEO, Lee Han-sang, received seven years for accidental homicide and corruption. Following his release from prison in 2002, Lee Han-sang worked as an evangelist in Mongolia.

City official Lee Chung-Woo, who was a chief administrator of the area where the store was located, was sentenced to three years in jail for bribery. Hwang Chol-Min, a former chief for the area, was found guilty of accepting a ₩12 million bribe from Lee Joon, and was sentenced to 10 years in prison.

Other participating officials, including a former chief administrator of the Seocho district, were also jailed. Other parties sentenced included a number of the store's executives and the company responsible for completing the building.

Compensation 
At first, families of the victims were asking for an average of $361,000 each. However, the City of Seoul, representing the store's owner, offered to pay $220,000 for each victim, arguing that he could not afford to pay more.

Two months after the collapse, Lee Joon and Lee Han-sang submitted a jointly-signed memo to Seoul, offering their entire wealth to compensate the families of the victims. As a result, the Sampoong Group ceased to exist.

The settlement involved 3,293 cases, totaling ₩375.8 billion (about $300 million). Payouts were complete by 2003.

Reaction 

The initial reaction of the disaster was an enormous public outrage that led to months of public demonstrations on the streets of Seoul. The disaster led to skepticism and fears regarding safety standards on other engineering projects undertaken as South Korea had experienced an economic boom during the 1980s, and it resulted in a review of South Korean safety regulations; the disaster also revealed the level of corruption and greed among city officials, who were willing to accept bribes with little regard for public safety.

Legacy 

The remains of the store were demolished shortly after the collapse and the recovery operations; the site remained vacant until 2000. The families of the victims requested that a memorial be built on the site, but it was opposed by the Seochu District government, forcing the Seoul Metropolitan Government to mediate the dispute. In a controversial move, the memorial was built elsewhere and the land sold off to a private developer. The site of the collapse is now home to a luxury apartment complex, Acrovista Apartments, whose construction began in 2001 and was completed in 2004.

Memorials
The Yangjae Citizen's Forest has a sculpture made in memory of the collapse. The twelve-meter high marble memorial was designed by Ewha Womans University professor and sculptor Kim Bong-gu, and funded by the Sampoong Group as compensation to the victims.

Cultural references

Documentary
Blueprint for Disaster - The Sampoong Collapse (2004)
Seconds from Disaster - Sampoong Department Store Collapse (2006)

Film
Judgement (1999)
Traces of Love (2006)

Television
Chocolate (2019)
Black (2017)
Move to Heaven (2021)
Rain or Shine (2017)
Reply 1994 (2013)
The Scandal (2013)
When My Love Blooms (2020)

See also

Jaya Supermarket
Seongsu Bridge Disaster
2013 Rana Plaza factory collapse
Surfside condominium collapse

Notes

References

Further reading

External links

The Korea Times: The Dawn of Modern Korea - Collapse of Sampoong Department Store (Archive)
South Korean disasters
A National Emergency Management Agency (NEMA) article on the Sampoong Disaster

Building collapses in 1995
Disasters in department stores
Man-made disasters in South Korea
1990s in Seoul
1995 disasters in South Korea
1995 in South Korea
June 1995 events in Asia
Disasters in Seoul
Seocho District
Corporate scandals
Collapsed buildings and structures
Disasters